Copa Constitució 2007 is the fifteenth season of Andorra's football knockout tournament. The competition started on 21 January 2007 with the first-round games and ended on 21 May 2007 with the Final. The defending champions are FC Rànger's.

The winners will earn a place in the first qualifying round of the UEFA Cup 2007–08.

Results

First round
This round was entered by teams from 2006 to 2007 Segona Divisió season. The matches were played on 21 January 2007.

|}

Second round
The winners from the previous round competed in this round, as well as the teams from this year's Primera Divisió placed fifth to eighth – CE Principat, Inter Club d'Escaldes, FC Encamp, and Atlètic d'Escaldes – also entered in this round. The matches were played from 28 January 2007.

|}

Quarterfinals
The winners from the previous round competed in this round for turkey and together with the teams from Primera Divisió placed first to fourth after 7 rounds played – FC Santa Coloma, UE Sant Julià, FC Rànger's, and FC Lusitanos. The ties were played on 4 February 2007.

|}

Semifinals
The ties were played on 13 May 2007.

|}

Final

References

External links
 Copa Constitució on rsssf.com
 

Copa Constitució seasons
Andorra
Copa